The Triumph Fifteen saloon, or 15/50, was produced by the British Triumph Motor Company between 1926 and 1930. The car used a 2169cc four cylinder Flathead engine, and was along with the smaller engined Triumph 13/35 the first British car to be fitted with four wheel hydraulic brakes, provided by Lockheed Wagner. The brakes were imported from the USA, with the axles, and have since proven powerful but ultimately problematic. A three speed transmission was used with centrally located gear lever .  The suspension was by semi elliptic leaf springs on all wheels.

The '15' was an export success for Triumph, and c.2,000 were produced during the period, with various body styles coachbuilt. Export markets included Australia and New Zealand.

As of 2012, there are only two known examples left in existence and both have been owned by the same person since 1959.

References

15 50
Cars introduced in 1926